Rowan Osborne may refer to:
 Rowan Osborne (canoeist)
 Rowan Osborne (rugby union)